The Ad Libs were an American vocal group from Bayonne, New Jersey, United States, primarily active during the early 1960s. Featuring their characteristic female lead vocals with male "doo-wop" backing, their 1964 single "The Boy from New York City", written by George Davis and John T. Taylor, in 1965 was their only major Billboard Hot 100 hit.

Known originally as The Creators, the group formed in 1964 in Bayonne with Hugh Harris, Danny Austin, Dave Watt, Norman Donegan and Mary Ann Thomas. "The Boy from New York City" was released in December 1964; and by March 1965 had peaked at number 8 on the US Hot 100. The group next recorded "He Ain't No Angel" which reached number 100 in 1965. The next two singles failed to chart, and The Ad Libs' contract was not renewed by Red Bird Records company. In 1969, they had a last R&B chart hit with the song "Giving Up", which peaked at number 34 on the US Billboard R&B chart. They continued to record into the early 1980s, but never repeated the success of "The Boy from New York City".

"The Boy from New York City" charted again in the UK for Darts in 1978 and in the US for The Manhattan Transfer in 1981. The song has been used in a commercial for Everybody Hates Chris on the Paramount Comedy channel in the UK.

Dave Watt died on December 5, 2008.

Discography

Singles

Compilation albums
 The Ad Libs & Friends - Collectables Records, 1996
 I Don't Need No Fortune Teller - Passion Records, 2010
 The Complete Blue Cat Recordings - Real Gone Music, 2012

References

External links
 The Ad Libs at Doo Wop Heaven

American soul musical groups
Musical groups established in 1964
Musical groups from New Jersey